Simone Chiavari was a Roman Catholic prelate who served as Bishop of Brugnato (1492–1502).

Biography
On 11 April 1492, Simone Chiavari was appointed during the papacy of Pope Innocent VIII as Bishop of Brugnato.
He served as Bishop of Brugnato until his resignation in 1502.

See also
Catholic Church in Italy

References

External links and additional sources
 (for Chronology of Bishops) 
 (for Chronology of Bishops) 

15th-century Italian Roman Catholic bishops
16th-century Italian Roman Catholic bishops
Bishops appointed by Pope Innocent VIII